The following is a list of ecoregions in the Central African Republic, according to the Worldwide Fund for Nature (WWF).

Terrestrial ecoregions
by major habitat type

Tropical and subtropical moist broadleaf forests

 Northeastern Congolian lowland forests
 Northwestern Congolian lowland forests
 Western Congolian swamp forests

Tropical and subtropical grasslands, savannas, and shrublands

 East Sudanian savanna
 Northern Congolian forest–savanna mosaic
 Sahelian Acacia savanna

Freshwater ecoregions
by bioregion

Congo

 Sangha
 Sudanic Congo (Oubangi)

Nilo-Sudan

 Lake Chad Catchment

References
 Burgess, Neil, Jennifer D’Amico Hales, Emma Underwood (2004). Terrestrial Ecoregions of Africa and Madagascar: A Conservation Assessment. Island Press, Washington DC.
 Spalding, Mark D., Helen E. Fox, Gerald R. Allen, Nick Davidson et al. "Marine Ecoregions of the World: A Bioregionalization of Coastal and Shelf Areas". Bioscience Vol. 57 No. 7, July/August 2007, pp. 573-583.
 Thieme, Michelle L. (2005). Freshwater Ecoregions of Africa and Madagascar: A Conservation Assessment. Island Press, Washington DC.
 Toham, Andre Kamdem et al., eds. (2006). A Vision for Biodiversity Conservation in Central Africa: Biological Priorities for Conservation in the Guinean-Congolian Forest and Freshwater Region. World Wildlife Fund, Washington DC. Page A-52.

 
Ecoregions
Central African Republic